Frédéric Esther (born 8 June 1972 in Meulan, France) is a French former boxer, who competed in the middleweight (– 75 kg) division. He represented his native country at the 2000 Summer Olympics in Sydney, Australia, where he was stopped in the quarterfinales of the light middleweight division (– 71 kg) by eventual silver medalist Marian Simion of Romania.

Before turning professional in December 2000, Esther won the European title in 1998, and won the bronze medal at the 1999 World Amateur Boxing Championships in Houston, United States.

Olympic results
Defeated Andrey Mishin (Russia) 16-11
Defeated Firat Karagollu (Turkey) 18-16
Lost to Marian Simion (Romania) RSC 3

External links
 
 Boxing-Records

1972 births
Living people
Middleweight boxers
Boxers at the 2000 Summer Olympics
Olympic boxers of France
French male boxers
AIBA World Boxing Championships medalists